is a Japanese footballer currently playing as a defender for Iwaki FC from 2023.

Club career 

Ishida begin first professional career with Gainare Tottori from 2021. When he made his J.League debut as a substitute in the 54th minute of the opening match against Kagoshima United, he scored his first professional goal in the 60th minute and contributed to the come from behind victory. He left from the club in 2022 after two seasons at Tottori.

On 7 December at same year, Ishida joined to J2 newly promoted, Iwaki FC for upcoming 2023 season.

Career statistics

Club 

.

Notes

References

External links
 

2002 births
Living people
Japanese footballers
Association football defenders
J2 League players
J3 League players
Tokushima Vortis players
Gainare Tottori players
Iwaki FC players